NTFL may mean:
 Northern Territories Federation of Labour in Canada
 Northern Territory Football League in Australia
 Northern Tasmanian Football League in Australia

See also
 New Tube for London (NTfL), a planned programme  to introduce automatic trains on several London Underground deep-tube lines.